Pseudopsocus rostocki is a species of Psocoptera from Elipsocidae family that can be found in England and Ireland. It can also be found in Benelux, France, Germany, Poland, Spain, and Sweden. The species are black and white coloured, and are striped. It feeds on lichen-covered conifers.

Habitat
The species feeds on veteran open-grown oaks.

References

Elipsocidae
Insects described in 1882
Taxa named by Hermann Julius Kolbe
Psocoptera of Europe